Qin Lang (199 – 238), courtesy name Yuanming, was a military general of the state of Cao Wei during the Three Kingdoms period of China.

Family background
Qin Lang was born in the late Eastern Han dynasty and his ancestral home was in Xinxing Commandery (新興郡; around present-day Xinzhou, Shanxi). His father was Qin Yilu, a former subordinate of Lü Bu, a warlord who lived in the late Eastern Han dynasty. His mother was Qin Yilu's ex-wife, Lady Du (杜氏), who was taken by the warlord Cao Cao as a concubine after Lü Bu's defeat and death at the Battle of Xiapi in 198. At a young age, Qin Lang accompanied his mother and joined Cao Cao's household. Cao Cao adopted Qin Lang as a son and doted on him. Once, during a banquet, Cao Cao told his guests, "Would someone love his foster son (referring to Qin Lang) in the same way as I do?"

During Cao Rui's reign
When Qin Lang grew up, he travelled around China and did not take up any appointments in the civil service or in the military. After Cao Cao's death in 220 CE, he remained in the state of Cao Wei – founded by Cao Cao's son and successor, Cao Pi – during the Three Kingdoms period. In 227, after Cao Rui, Cao Pi's son, ascended the Wei throne upon the death of his father, Qin Lang was appointed General of Valiant Cavalry (驍騎將軍) and Official Who Concurrently Serves in the Palace (給事中), and he constantly accompanied Cao Rui on his tours. During his reign, Cao Rui liked to pick on people's wrongdoings, and many people who committed minor offences were executed by him. Qin Lang never advised Cao Rui against his ways, nor did he recommend any talents to the Wei imperial court, but he was still nonetheless deeply favoured by the emperor, who often consulted him and called him by his childhood name "Ah-su" (阿穌). Cao Rui also showered gifts on Qin Lang and even had a large residence constructed in the capital Luoyang for the latter. Other officials were aware that Qin Lang was not much of a capable and talented person, but they knew that he was close to the emperor Cao Rui, so they often bribed him and attempted to curry favour with him. In return, Qin Lang used his status and close relationship with Cao Rui to help these officials get promotions and even titles of nobility.

In the autumn of 233, the Xianbei chieftain Budugen, who had previously surrendered to Wei, rebelled and collaborated with another Xianbei leader Kebineng. Bi Gui, the Inspector of Bing Province in Wei, led an army from his province to attack the Xianbei but was defeated. Budugen and Kebineng became more united after that and they constantly raided Wei's northeastern borders. Cao Rui ordered Qin Lang to lead another army from the capital to attack the Xianbei, and Qin succeeded in driving the enemy far into the deserts in the north. By winter, Budugen's subordinates had surrendered to Qin Lang in Bing Province, so Qin and his army returned to Luoyang.

In late 238, Cao Rui became seriously ill, and he wanted to appoint Cao Yu, Xiahou Xian (夏侯獻), Cao Shuang, Cao Zhao (曹肇) and Qin Lang to help him administer state affairs in his absence. Xiahou Xian and others had disagreements with the ministers Liu Fang (劉放) and Sun Zi (孫資), so Liu Fang and Sun Zi managed to persuade Cao Rui to change his decision. Cao Rui then appointed Cao Shuang and Sima Yi as the regents instead, while Qin Lang and the others were dismissed from office.

Descendants
Qin Lang's son, Qin Xiu (秦秀), was known for being a sturdy, strict and outspoken person. He served as an Academician (博士) in the Imperial University (太學) during the reign of Emperor Wu of the Jin dynasty after the end of the Three Kingdoms period.

See also
 Cao Wei family trees#Lady Du
 Lists of people of the Three Kingdoms

References

Sources
 Chen, Shou (3rd century). Records of the Three Kingdoms (Sanguozhi).
 Pei, Songzhi (5th century). Annotations to Records of the Three Kingdoms (Sanguozhi zhu).
 Sima, Guang (1084). Zizhi Tongjian, Volume 72.

Year of birth unknown
Year of death unknown
Cao Wei generals
Family of Cao Cao